Five Days is a 1954 British film noir directed by Montgomery Tully starring Dane Clark, Paul Carpenter and Thea Gregory. It was produced by Hammer Film Productions and shot at Bray Studios with sets designed by the art director J. Elder Wills. It was made as a second feature for release on a double bill. It was released in the United States by Lippert Pictures as Paid to Kill.

Plot
James Nevill, a nearly bankrupt businessman, hires his best friend to kill him so his wife can collect on his life insurance. After his business takes a sudden upswing he changes his mind, but he must get to the killer and tell him so before the killer gets to him first. Nevill suffers several near misses before learning that his partner and another person really do want to kill him, not his best friend, whom they have kidnapped and framed.

Cast
 Dane Clark as James Nevill
 Cecile Chevreau as Joan Peterson
 Paul Carpenter as Paul Kirby
 Thea Gregory as Andrea Nevill
 Anthony Forwood as Glanville
 Arthur Young as Hyson
 Howard Marion-Crawford as Cyrus McGowan
 Arnold Diamond as Perkins 
 Charles Hawtrey as 	Bill 
 Peter Gawthorne as 	Bowman
 Avis Scott as Eileen 
 Geoffrey Sumner as 	Chapter 
 Ross Hutchinson as 	Ingham
 Martin Lawrence as 	Grover - Masseur
 Leslie Wright as 	Hunter 
 Larry Taylor as 	Tough in Bar
 Warren Mitchell as 	Laughing Man in Bar
 Hugo Schuster as 	Professor

References

Bibliography
 Chibnall, Steve & McFarlane, Brian. The British 'B' Film. Palgrave MacMillan, 2009.

External links
 
 
 
 

1954 films
1954 crime drama films
British black-and-white films
British crime drama films
Film noir
Films about contract killing
Films directed by Montgomery Tully
Hammer Film Productions films
Lippert Pictures films
Films shot at Bray Studios
Films set in London
1950s English-language films
1950s British films